Daughter of the East, also known as 'The Boy of the Dardanelles', is a 1924 Australian silent film directed by Roy Darling. It is considered a lost film.

Plot
Harry Wharton is born of English parents in Turkey. Despite being engaged to a woman back in England, he falls in love with an orphaned Armenian girl, Marian. A Turkish pasha also loves Marian and kidnaps her. Wharton tries to rescue her but is captured just as England and Turkey declare war on each other. He escapes disguised as a Greek and joins the Australians at the Gallipoli Campaign.

After the war Wharton finds Marian who has been traumatised by the war. He helps her recover and his fiancée gives him his freedom, enabling Wharton and Marian to be married.

Production
The film was financed by Adam Tavlradi, a Greek cafe owner keen to show a film demonstrating the contribution of Greeks to the British war effort. It was shot in and around Sydney in mid 1923, with battles scenes shot on Maroubra Beach. It was previewed under the title The Boy of the Dardanelles.

Release
As he had with his first film, The Lust for Gold (1922), Darling had great trouble getting the film released, but eventually managed to make a deal with Paramount. However box office response was not strong and Darling only received £50 in returns.

Only 25 seconds of the movie survive today.

Cast
Dorothy Hawtree
Paul Eden
Catherine Tearle
Charles Villiers
Adam Tavalridi

References

External links

Daughter of the East at National Film and Sound Archive
"Beyond the Rolling Wave: A History of Greek Settlement in New South Wales" – an article for the NSW Heritage Office mentioning Adam Tavlaridi

1924 films
Australian drama films
Australian silent films
Australian black-and-white films
Lost Australian films
1924 lost films
Lost drama films
1924 drama films
Silent drama films